Joseph Kwaku Nayan is a teacher and Ghanaian politician who served as the member of parliament for the Nkwanta North Constituency in the 4th and 5th Parliament of the 4th Republic of Ghana.

Early life and education 
Joseph was born on 22 May 1964. He hails from Damanko a town in the Volta Region of Ghana. He obtained his Diploma in Education from the University of Education, Winneba in 2006. He further went to the University of Cape Coast where he is pursuing his master's degree in Governance and Leadership.

Career 
He is an Educationist. He was the Principal Superintendent and Headmaster of Damanko Junior High School. He was the former Deputy Volta Regional Minister. He was also the Deputy Chief Executive Officer in charge of support services.

Politics 
He is a member of New Patriotic Party. He was elected into office as member of parliament to represent Nkwanta North Constituency in the Volta region of Ghana in January 2005. He contested for re-election into office for second term in the December 2012 elections and won with 9,426 votes out of 21,676 total valid votes in his Constituency

Personal life 
He is married with six children. He identifies as a Christian.

References 

Living people
University of Cape Coast alumni
University of Education, Winneba alumni
1964 births
Ghanaian MPs 2009–2013